Miss USA 2005 was the 54th Miss USA pageant, held in Baltimore, Maryland on April 11, 2005. It was won by Chelsea Cooley of North Carolina.

Fifty-one state titleholders competed for the title of Miss USA in the Hippodrome Theatre on April 11, 2005. The hosts were Access Hollywood stars Nancy O'Dell and Billy Bush.

This was the first of two years the pageant was held in Maryland, as it was held in Los Angeles, California in 2004. The new location was announced in October 2004.

Competition
After the delegate introductions and opening number, the top fifteen contestants were announced. These girls went on to compete in the evening gown competition, where they displayed an evening gown of their choice and were judged in poise and grace. This year's gown competition was notable for two daring gowns, that of Brenda Brabham, Miss Pennsylvania USA, and Meaghan Jarensky, Miss New York USA. Brabham's gold gown featured a bra-style top connected to a flowing skirt with high slit, revealing most of her top half like a swimsuit, and Jarensky's silver Graecan gown also was an unusual cut.

The second cut followed, with the delegates being narrowed down to ten. The finalists then competed in the swimsuit competition, wearing specially designed floral swimsuits from Endless Sun. Brittany Hogan, Miss California USA dropped her cloth as she walked in swimsuit, but despite this went on to place as 1st runner up. Miss New York USA, Meaghan Jarensky almost tripped on the fallen cloth.

The final five were then announced, and the delegates competed in interview with the "final question". The questions were all written by Miss USA 2004, Shandi Finnessey and the top 5. Finally, the runners-up were announced, and Chelsea Cooley of North Carolina was crowned Miss USA.

Results

Placements

Special awards

Historical significance 
 North Carolina wins competition for the first time and surpasses its previous highest placement from the last year. Also becoming in the 29th state who does it for the first time.
 California earns the 1st runner-up position for the fifth time. The last time it placed this was in 1998.
 Kentucky earns the 2nd runner-up position for the first time and surpasses its previous highest placement in 1965, becoming its highest placement of the state.
 Illinois earns the 3rd runner-up position for the third time. The last time it placed this was in 1979.
 Florida earns the 4th runner-up position for the third time. The last time it placed this was in 1966.
 States that placed in semifinals the previous year were Florida, North Carolina, Oklahoma and Texas.
 Texas placed for the fifth consecutive year.
 Oklahoma placed for the third consecutive year. 
 Florida and North Carolina made their second consecutive placement.
 Michigan last placed in 2003.
 California and New York last placed in 2002.
 Utah last placed in 1998.
 Illinois last placed in 1996.
 Kentucky and Maryland last placed in 1995.
 Pennsylvania last placed in 1993.
 Mississippi last placed in 1990.
 West Virginia last placed in 1987.
 Arkansas last placed in 1982.
 New Mexico and Tennessee breaks an ongoing streak of placements since 2003.
 Alabama and South Carolina break an ongoing streak of placements since 2002.

Judges
The celebrity panel of final competition judges was announced on 10 March 2005. The judges were:
Michael Phelps – Olympic gold medalist swimmer
Molly Sims – Star of NBC show Las Vegas
Sugar Ray Leonard – Boxer
Frederic Fekkai – Beauty expert
Pamela Dennis – Fashion designer
Raj Bhakta – The Apprentice contestant
Ksenia Maksimova – Model
Brody Hutzler – Actor on Days of Our Lives

Delegates
The Miss USA 2005 delegates were:

 Alabama – Jessica Tinney
 Alaska – Aleah Scheick
 Arizona – Mariana Loya
 Arkansas – Jessica Furrer
 California – Brittany Hogan
 Colorado – Lauren Cisneros
 Connecticut – Melissa Mandak
 Delaware – Sheena Benton
 District of Columbia – Sarah-Elizabeth Langford
 Florida – Melissa Witek
 Georgia – Tanisha Brito
 Hawaii – Jennifer Fairbank
 Idaho – Sade Aiyeku
 Illinois – Jill Gulseth
 Indiana – Kaitlyn Christopher
 Iowa – Joy Robinson
 Kansas – Rachel Saunders
 Kentucky – Kristen Johnson
 Louisiana – Candice Stewart
 Maine – Erica Commeau
 Maryland – Marina Harrison
 Massachusetts – Cristina Nardozzi
 Michigan – Crystal Hayes
 Minnesota – Carrie Lee
 Mississippi – Jennifer Adcock
 Missouri – Andrea Ciliberti
 Montana – Amanda Kimmel
 Nebraska – Jana Murrell
 Nevada – Shivonn Geeb
 New Hampshire – Candace Glickman
 New Jersey – Sylvia Pogorzelski
 New Mexico – Jacqueline Deaner
 New York – Meaghan Jarensky
 North Carolina – Chelsea Cooley
 North Dakota – Chrissa Miller
 Ohio – Aisha Berry
 Oklahoma – Laci Scott
 Oregon – Jessica Carlson
 Pennsylvania – Brenda Brabham
 Rhode Island – Allison Paganetti
 South Carolina – Sarah Medley
 South Dakota – Jessica Fjerstad
 Tennessee – Amy Colley
 Texas – Tyler Willis
 Utah – Marin Poole
 Vermont – Amanda Mitteer
 Virginia – Jennifer Pitts
 Washington – Amy Crawford
 West Virginia – Kristin Morrison
 Wisconsin – Melissa Ann Young
 Wyoming – Abby Norman

Contestant notes
In a record at the time, seven contestants had previously competed in the Miss America pageant, outnumbering those who had previously competed at Miss Teen USA. Four of the contestants had competed together at Miss America 2003.
Delegates who had previously competed at Miss America were:
Mariana Loya (Arizona) - Miss Washington 1998
Jennifer Adcock (Mississippi) - Miss Mississippi 2002 (top ten at Miss America 2003)
Jennifer Pitts (Virginia) - Miss Virginia 2002
Sarah Elizabeth Langford (District of Columbia) - Miss District of Columbia 2002
Tanisha Brito (Georgia) - Miss Connecticut 2002 (top ten at Miss America 2003)
Candace Glickman (New Hampshire) - Miss New Hampshire 2003 (top ten at Miss America 2004)
Marina Harrison (Maryland) - Miss Maryland 2003 (third runner-up at Miss America 2004)
Contestants who had previously competed at Miss Teen USA were:
Chelsea Cooley (North Carolina) - Miss North Carolina Teen USA 2000
Kristen Johnson (Kentucky) - Miss Kentucky Teen USA 2000 (second runner-up at Miss Teen USA 2000)
Sarah Medley (South Carolina) - Miss South Carolina Teen USA 2001
Candice Stewart (Louisiana) - Miss Louisiana Teen USA 2002
Jessica Fjerstad (South Dakota) - Miss South Dakota Teen USA 2002
Marin Poole (Utah) - Miss Utah Teen USA 2002
Kristen Johnson (Kentucky), Melissa Witek (Florida) and Kaitlyn Christopher (Indiana) later competed at "Miss Team USA" on NBC's reality television show Treasure Hunters.
Amanda Kimmel (Montana) appeared on Survivor: China, Survivor: Micronesia and Survivor: Heroes vs. Villains. She placed 3rd, 2nd and 9th respectively. She represented United States at Miss Earth 2005, where she placed as a finalist.
Jana Murrell (Nebraska) went on to represent the United States at Miss Earth 2008, where she placed as a semi-finalist.
Candice Stewart (Louisiana) will be appearing on Big Brother 15.

Pre-pageant special
Six Miss USA contestants competed in a special edition of Fear Factor.
The contestants involved were:
Miss Fear Factor: Sarah-Elizabeth Langford (Miss District of Columbia USA 2005)
2nd place tie: Brittany Hogan (Miss California USA 2005),
3rd place: Meaghan Jarensky (Miss New York USA 2005)
4th place: Laci Scott (Miss Oklahoma USA 2005)
5th place: Cristina Nardozzi (Miss Massachusetts USA 2005)
6th place: Kristen Johnson (Miss Kentucky USA 2005)
Stunts
Stunt #1 (Water beams): Contestants had to work their way around a square-shaped beam structure and collect up to ten flags before jumping into the water below. The beams were rigged with high-pressure jets that sprayed water during the stunt. The four contestants who completed the stunt in the fastest time or those that collected the flags the fastest before falling advanced to the next round.

Stunt #2 (Triple Dump Tunnel) Contestants fought a high pressure water hose to make their way through an acrylic glass tunnel while attempting to pull down three chains and collect a key from each. The hose stopped after the retrieval of the second key. Each time they retrieved a key, a bucket containing 55 gallons of disgusting contents would be dumped on them. The first bucket contained dead fish and fish guts, the second bucket contained fish oil, and the third bucket contained red worms and super worms. At the end of the tunnel the contestants had to use the keys to open three locks, open a door, and grab a flag. The three that completed this stunt the fastest advanced to the finals.

Stunt #3 (Helicopter net-cage)'' Contestants had to work their way around the outside of a square-shaped cage made of cargo netting suspended under a helicopter, attempting to release 5 flags from the sides of the cage and 1 flag from the bottom of the cage. The one who released the most flags the fastest before falling into the water below won the competition.

See also
Miss Teen USA 2005
Miss Universe 2005

References

External links
Miss USA official website 

2005
2005 beauty pageants
April 2005 events in the United States
2005 in Maryland